Yvonne Doyle may refer to:
 Yvonne Doyle (physician),  Irish medical director and director of health protection for Public Health England
 Yvonne Doyle (Fair City), a character on the Irish soap opera Fair City
 Yvonne Doyle (tennis), Irish tennis player